Margherita Sarfatti (née Grassini; 8 April 1880 – 30 October 1961) was an Italian journalist, art critic, patron, collector, socialite, and prominent propaganda adviser of the National Fascist Party. She was Benito Mussolini's biographer as well as one of his mistresses.

Biography 
Sarfatti was born in Venice, the daughter of Amedeo Grassini and Emma Levi (whose cousin Giuseppe Levi was the father of Natalia Ginzburg). Amedeo was a wealthy Jewish lawyer and businessman. He was a fiscal attorney for the Venetian government and a close friend of Giuseppe Melchiorre Sarto, later Pope Pius X. He would later be made a Knight of the Order of the Crown of Italy.

Sarfatti grew up in a palazzo situated at the Canal Grande in Venice and was educated by private tutors. However, she was soon attracted by socialist ideas and escaped her parents' home at age 18 to marry Cesare Sarfatti, a Jewish lawyer from Padua. He was 13 years her senior, but shared her socialist beliefs. In 1902, the couple moved to Milan. There, they became prominent in the city's artistic life, hosting weekly Salons that became the centre of the Futurist and Novecento Italiano artistic movements. The Salons took place at the number 93 of Corso Venezia. Present at these gatherings were Mussolini, Massimo Bontempelli, Ada Negri, and a couple of sculptors Medardo Rosso and Arturo Martini. Margherita Sarfatti and her husband had several children. Their eldest son, Robert, enlisted in the Italian army during World War I, and was killed in action on Monte Baldo in January 1918, aged 18.

Personal friend and private collector of the right-wing avanguardist Umberto Boccioni, in 1911 Sarfatti met Benito Mussolini (three years her junior) and started a relationship with him. During this time she was working as an art critic at the newspaper Avanti! After losing her husband in 1924, she wrote a biography of Mussolini. This was first published in 1925 in Britain under the title The Life of Benito Mussolini; it was published the following year in Italy with the title Dux. Because of the fame of Mussolini and the author's familiarity with the dictator, the book was a success. Seventeen editions were printed and it was translated into 18 languages.

Sarfatti is memorialized in Guido Cadorin frescoes in the (now called) Grand Hotel Palace, Via Veneto No. 70, Rome.  "Fiammetta and I wanted to pass into immortality in the salon's frescoes," she remarked, referring to her daughter, who is portrayed with her in the frescoes.

Sarfatti had an influence over Mussolini's policies from 1922 until 1938, when Mussolini bowed to German pressure and after the Manifesto of Race enacted racial legislation, the fascist government's politics were not anti-semitic, and the party's membership rolls were open to Jews. In 1922, the group Novecento was enlarged to Anselmo Bucci, Leonardo Dudreville, Achille Funi, Gian Emilio Malerba, Pietro Marussig, Ubaldo Oppi, and Mario Sironi. Probably in reaction to the changing circumstances in Italy, Sarfatti left Italy in 1938 for Argentina and Uruguay; she worked as a journalist for the newspaper El Diario of Montevideo. After the war, in 1947, Sarfatti returned to her home country and once again became an influential force in Italian art.
She had contacts and personal knowledge of more exponents of the Italian Freemasonry, which Mussolini affirmed to badly tolerate.

In popular culture 
Actress Susan Sarandon portrayed Sarfatti in the 1999 movie Cradle Will Rock, written and directed by Sarandon's then longtime companion, Tim Robbins. Sarandon discussed her role, saying:
Margherita is someone who is a legitimate historical figure. She really existed. She really was Mussolini's mistress and was very involved in the cultural shaping of Italy's art movements. She was a patron of new painters in Italy. She came over to the United States to sell Mussolini to the American people, and she did that by using Hearst's column. She wrote a column, and that was how they prepared the United States people for the concept of entering the war on the side of Mussolini, I suppose. And also, she was trying to fund the war.

And the complication of this was the fact that she was Jewish, and she in fact supported thus her own crisis, which eventually would make her flee Italy to Argentina and Uruguay for several years until it was safe for her to return. Whether or not she was just in complete denial or she really truly believed that there was a way to sleep with Mussolini and not be held accountable, I don't know. But she ended up in an awkward position. She was hobnobbing with all these rich American people. I think in the context of the film, she's somebody who has a job to do and because she loved art, she sometimes finds herself to be giving all this art away to people she feels don't really appreciate it.

Bibliography
 Sarfatti, Margherita (2004) [1925]. The Life of Benito Mussolini. 
 Sarfatti, Margherita. My Fault: Mussolini As I Knew Him, New York City: Enigma Books, 2014, (edited and annotated with commentary by Brian R. Sullivan)

References

Further reading 
 Cannistraro, Philip, and Brian R. Sullivan (1993). Il Duce's Other Woman: The Untold Story of Margherita Sarfatti, Mussolini's Jewish Mistress. 
 Gutman, Daniel (2006). El amor judío de Mussolini. 
 Liffran, Françoise (2009). Margherita Sarfatti, L'égérie du duce, Biography. 
 Urso, Simona (2003). Margherita Sarfatti. Dal mito del Dux al mito americano. 
 Wieland, Karin (2004). Die Geliebte des Duce. Das Leben der Margherita Sarfatti und die Erfindung des Faschismus.

External links 
 A caricature by David Levine
 
 Mussolinis Femme-Fatale, New York Review of Books, 15 July 1993

Italian art critics
Italian women art critics
Italian fascists
1880 births
1961 deaths
Mistresses of Benito Mussolini
Italian Sephardi Jews
Venetian Jews
1930s in Italy
20th-century Italian writers
20th-century Italian women writers
Jewish fascists
Italian Freemasons
20th-century Italian journalists
Italian salon-holders